Eupithecia monticolans is a moth of the family Geometridae. It was first described by Arthur Gardiner Butler in 1881. It is endemic to the Hawaiian islands of Kauai, Oahu, Molokai, Maui, Lanai and Hawaii.

The larvae feed on Alphitonia ponderosa, Metrosideros, Pipturus, Railliardia and Styphelia tameiameiae.

References

External links

monticolans
Endemic moths of Hawaii
Moths described in 1881